OWL Arena, formerly Gerry Weber Stadion, is a multi-purpose indoor sports arena, located in Halle, North Rhine-Westphalia, in Germany. The capacity of the arena is 12,300 people and it opened in 1993.

In early 2020, a consortium of 13 sponsors became owner of the venue and its name was changed to OWL Arena.

Facilities 

The stadium has a retractable roof which can be closed in 88 seconds, which rules out the risk of tennis matches having to be suspended because of rain. The stadium is heated and also used for other sport events (handball, basketball, prisonball, volleyball and boxing), TV shows and concerts. It is one of the few grass court tennis tournaments around.

Halle Gerry-Weber-Stadion railway station is located 500m from the stadium on the Osnabrück to Bielefeld railway line.

Events

It hosts the Halle Open every year in June. On 2 April 2005, Irish vocal pop band Westlife held a concert for their The No 1's Tour supporting their album ...Allow Us to Be Frank.

In January 2007, several games of the Handball World Championship took place there; most of them were sold out with 11,000 spectators.

See also
 List of tennis stadiums by capacity
 List of indoor arenas in Germany

References

External links

 Official site
 World Stadiums site
 Wikimapia site
 Stadionwelt Gerry weber stadion detail
 Davis Cup Germany vs France February 2006

Indoor arenas in Germany
Tennis venues in Germany
Retractable-roof stadiums in Europe
Handball venues in Germany
Halle (Westfalen)
Sports venues in North Rhine-Westphalia
Buildings and structures in Gütersloh (district)
1993 establishments in Germany
Sports venues completed in 1993